The Boland Cavaliers (Boland Kavaliers in Afrikaans),  are a South African rugby union team that participates in the annual Currie Cup tournament. They draw players from the Cape Winelands and West Coast districts of Western Cape Province, and play out of Wellington at Boland Stadium.

Boland players are eligible for selection to the Stormers United Rugby Championship franchise.

Honors

 Five Currie Cup First Division titles:  2001, 2003, 2004, 2006, 2011

Current squad

The following players were included in the Boland Cavaliers squad for the 2022 Currie Cup First Division:

External links
 sport.iafrica.com profile

References